is a Japanese science fiction film directed by Takashi Miike. The screenplay by Masa Nakamura is based on the novel God's Puzzle by Shinji Kimoto.

Plot
17-year-old Saraka Homizu invents an infinity-shaped particle accelerator named Mugen. Meanwhile, sushi bar worker and aspiring guitarist Motokazu Watanuki takes his more confident twin brother Yoshikazu's place and attends his difficult physics classes while Yoshikazu is visiting the Phi Phi Islands in Thailand. Motozaku agrees as a means to be near his crush Shiratori, who is dating Airi, a grad student assisting with the seminar.

Believing that Motokazu is the smooth-talking Yoshikazu, Professor Hatomura asks him to convince Saraka Homizu to attend her lab course to complete her degree. Motozaku chooses the creation of the universe as the subject of his final project and Saraka joins him, telling Airi that it is possible for humans to create a universe. She plans to attempt it using Mugen.

When the sushi bar burns down, Motozaku takes a part-time job planting rice in a field underneath Mugen with Hashizume, an elderly student auditing the course. Yoshikazu continues traveling to Delhi, where his passport is stolen. Motokazu learns that Saraka dated Airi before Shiratori, making them rivals.

When the Mugen accelerator does not perform as expected, Saraka is made a scapegoat and public opinion turns against her. A nude video of her is posted on the Internet and Saraka takes advantage of this to spread a virus to computers throughout the world, allowing her to utilize them for more memory. Created through artificial insemination, Saraka cannot find meaning in her life and decides that if there is a god then it will stop her from creating a universe within our own and causing the collapse of our own.

During a powerful typhoon over Tokyo, Saraka reverses the rotation of one of the rings of the Mugen accelerator and prepares a collision, feeding off of power from the national power grid that she has hacked. Airi, who was involved in posting the video of Saraka to the Internet, crashes his car through the East Side building, allowing Motokazu to climb to the electric hut and play a rock version of Beethoven's 9th for Saraka, causing her to stop the experiment. She attempts to commit suicide by jumping from a bridge but Motozaku convinces her to come to him and eat the sushi he made and brought for her.

Airi commits suicide and Saraka is arrested. Motozaku fights with the media and lands in prison, where he writes his final thesis on the theory of sushi relativity. Yoshikazu is deported from India and returns. Saraka is eventually released and visits Motozaku at his sushi bar.

Cast
Hayato Ichihara as Yoshikazu Watanuki / Motokazu Watanuki
Mitsuki Tanimura as Saraka
Kenichi Endō as Chief of power station
Yusuke Hirayama
Yuriko Ishida as Ms. Hatomura
Nozomu Iwao as Sudo
Masaya Kikawada as Airi
Yoshio Kojima as Student
Jun Kunimura as Murakami
Rio Matsumoto as Shiratori
Naomasa Musaka as Gonda
Eugene Nomura
Reisen Ri as Yamada
Ayumu Saito
Takashi Sasano as Hashizume
Christian Storms as TV Interviewer
Taro Suwa as Owner of Sushi Shop
Koutaro Tanaka as Sakura
Mayumi Wakamura as Saraka's mother

Production and release
God's Puzzle is a film adaptation of the novel of the same name by Shinji Kimoto.

Filming took place in Mito, Ibaraki, Japan.

The film was also promoted under the title The Puzzle of God.

Reception
Rob Nelson of variety.com writes, "Intermittently bizarre rather than thoroughly so, the pic plays by CG-powered rules of a smart-kids-save-the-world actioner, adding Miike’s wacky narrative digressions and a bit of animation to mostly enjoyable effect." He complains that "Miike’s most conventional pic is least convincing in its serious moments, as would-be stimulating debates of God’s existence ring hollow" but writes that "pic’s cinematography — in 35mm, with short India-set scenes on DV — is vibrant, and the FX kick up a storm."

Pedro Morata of Asian Movie Pulse wrote that the film offers "a full spectacle worthy of the best films of natural disasters" as well as "a well-constructed visual presentation, with particularly well-designed frames", ultimately finding that it is "Definitely worth watching."

Author Tom Mes of Midnight Eye acknowledges that Miike's "films can be hit and miss" and that "business is still as usual", but states that, "as is so often the case with a Miike film, a closer look proves to be most rewarding. The devotee will recognize in God's Puzzle's obsession with the creation, annihilation and meaning of life a continuation of the questions posed in earlier films by the director", concluding that "this is still the familiar Miike universe. We are merely exploring different corners."

References

External links
 

2008 films
2000s Japanese films
2008 science fiction films
Films about guitars and guitarists
Films about quantum mechanics
Films about physics
Films about twins
Films based on Japanese novels
Films directed by Takashi Miike
Films set in Delhi
Films set in Tokyo
Films set in universities and colleges
Films shot in Ibaraki Prefecture
2000s Japanese-language films
Japanese science fiction films
Toei Company films